Olga Belova (born 22 January 1983 in Moscow, Russian SFSR, Soviet Union) is a Russian former individual rhythmic gymnast.

Career 
Belova won the team gold medal (with Yulia Barsukova, Irina Tchachina and Alina Kabaeva) at the 1999 World Championships in Osaka, Japan and the 2000 European Championships in Zaragoza, Spain.

She competed at the 2001 Summer Universiade in Beijing, where she won bronze in all-around, rope and a gold medal in clubs.
She was a member of the Russian team that won gold at the 2001 World Championships in Madrid but they were later disqualified due to Alina Kabaeva and Irina Tchachina testing positive for a banned diuretic.

Belova completed her career in 2004.

External links
 
 

1983 births
Living people
Russian rhythmic gymnasts
Gymnasts from Moscow
Universiade medalists in gymnastics
Medalists at the Rhythmic Gymnastics World Championships
Universiade gold medalists for Russia
Universiade bronze medalists for Russia